Tremendous Sea of Love is the fourth studio album by Passion Pit, self-released on March 24, 2017 and later officially on July 28.

Background 
During February and March 2017, several new Passion Pit songs were uploaded on YouTube on the account The Wishart Group (from the name of a project started by Michael Angelakos and dedicated to supporting musicians by providing them with legal, educational and healthcare services, with a focus on mental health, a topic on which Angelakos has been especially forthcoming), foreshadowing a fourth album for 2017.  The songs have since been taken down, but Angelakos announced that he would give a downloadable copy of the album for free to anyone who retweeted neuroscientist Michael F. Wells' tweet on the importance of science and research.

Michael Angelakos to his fans on the perception of the album:

On July 12, an official release date was set for July 28 on all streaming services.

Track listing

References



2017 albums
Passion Pit albums